The 2020–21 Scottish Championship was the eighth season of the Scottish Championship, the second tier of Scottish football. 

Ten teams contested the league: Alloa Athletic, Arbroath, Ayr United, Dundee, Dunfermline Athletic, Greenock Morton, Heart of Midlothian, Inverness Caledonian Thistle, Queen of the South and Raith Rovers.

In June 2020, eight of the ten clubs voted in favour of shortening the season from the usual 36 games to 27 (playing each other three instead of four times), with the season starting on 16 October 2020. This was done to reduce costs in light of the coronavirus pandemic.

Teams
The following teams changed division after the 2019–20 season.

To Championship
Promoted from League One
Raith Rovers
Relegated from the Premiership
Heart of Midlothian

From Championship
Relegated to League One
Partick Thistle
Promoted to the Premiership
Dundee United

Stadia and locations

Personnel and kits

Managerial changes

League summary

League table

Results
Teams play each other three times, twice in the first two thirds of the season (home and away) and once in the last third of the season, making a total of 135 games, with each team playing 27.

First two thirds of season (Matches 1–18)

Last third of season (Matches 19–27)

Season statistics

Scoring

Top scorers

Source:

Hat-tricks

Most assists

Source:

Attendances
Games are mostly being played behind closed doors due to the COVID-19 pandemic. Limited attendance is allowed at some grounds with strict conditions under the Scottish Government Tier system, dependent on the club's geographical location.

Awards

Monthly awards

End-of-season awards

Championship play-offs
The second bottom team (Greenock Morton) entered into a 4-team playoff with the 2nd-4th placed teams in 2020–21 Scottish League One. Cove Rangers and Airdrieonians have also secured playoff spots.

Semi-final

First leg

Second leg

Final

First leg

Second leg

References

External links
Official website

Scottish Championship seasons
2
2
Scot